The Xiaomi Mi Note series are smartphones (or phablets) made by Xiaomi. The series include the Mi Note and Mi Note Pro. On October 25, 2016, the Xiaomi Mi Note 2 was released. The Mi Note 3, which has a Snapdragon 660 and a Curved 5.5 inch screen  was released in September 2017, followed by further models.

Versions

Pro

Xiaomi Mi Note Pro was released in China in May 2015. Announced in January 2015, it was intended to be an upgrade to the Xiaomi Mi Note (also announced January 2015). The Mi Note Pro inherited some of its features from its less-powerful predecessor, while upgrading the many features, such as the screen resolution, amount of RAM, battery capacity, and base operating system.

The original Mi Note Pro was relatively difficult to obtain except in China, as the only other way of acquiring it was through third-party carriers, adding a premium to the cost.

Hardware
The original Mi Note Pro's design is exactly the same as its Mi Note counterpart as they both have a 5.7" display, Gorilla Glass 3 back panel, Dual SIM, 13 MP rear camera with Optical Image Stabilization, auto-focus and dual-LED (dual tone) flash, 3.5 mm headphone jack, micro USB v2.0 port, and so on. However, the Mi Note Pro contains a 2K (1440 × 2560) display, as opposed to the Mi Note's 1080p (1080 × 1920) display, 4 GB RAM (3 GB in the Mi Note), Qualcomm Snapdragon 810 Octa-core CPU (Snapdragon 801 Quad-core 2.5 GHz CPU in the Mi Note), 3090mAh fast-charging battery (3000mAh fast-charging battery in the Mi Note), and comes in a Gold variant in addition to the Black and White variants (only Black and White for Mi Note).

The Mi Note Pro features Xiaomi's Sunlight Display technology, which is meant to adapt the display brightness so that the screen is more visible in the bright outdoors.

The Mi Note Pro comes with 64 GB onboard storage. Unlike the Mi Note's 16 GB/64 GB options, the Mi Note Pro does not come in a 16 GB variant.

Software
The Mi Note Pro comes pre-installed with Android 5.0.1 "Lollipop" loaded with the MIUI 6 custom skin. One main change of the new UI includes the removal of the app drawer, forcing all installed apps to appear on the home screen. The OS also includes a Themes application that allows the user to change the look of the UI.

The Mi Note's one-handed mode is also found on the Mi Note Pro, and must be enabled in Settings before use. It can be activated by swiping to the left or right from the home button, at which point the screen size can be configured to 3.5, 4 or 4.5 inches.

Reception
CNET says "that it's a shame" that "the Xiaomi Mi Note Pro will not be officially sold outside China," further stating that it is "easily the fastest Xiaomi smartphone yet, and that it looks and feels like a high-quality flagship device with mass appeal".

For those who reside outside China, and "are willing to take the risk of getting one from third-party resellers – there may be no way to get an official warranty when going through a third-party – and have the patience to deal with the lack of native Google apps support, you'll find a phone that rivals the Samsung Galaxy S6s and iPhone 6s of the world in both design and performance." CNET also mentioned that the Mi Note Pro "does lack advanced forward-looking features like a fingerprint sensor."

CNET concluded that at the price it goes for in China, which is US$485, which is "about half the price of the S6 and 6 Plus there", the phone is "a great buy if you're in the country and don't already own a flagship phone."

See also
 Comparison of smartphones

References

External links
 

Android (operating system) devices
Mobile phones introduced in 2015
Phablets
Mobile phones with 4K video recording
Discontinued flagship smartphones
Xiaomi smartphones